Amynothrips andersoni is a species of thrips known as alligator weed thrips. It has been used as an agent of biological pest control against the noxious aquatic plant known as alligator weed (Alternanthera philoxeroides).

This thrips is native to South America. It has been imported and released in the United States to feed upon alligator weed. It is now established in much of the southeastern United States. The adult thrips is 2 millimeters long, shiny, and black. A short-winged form and a long-winged flying form exist; the latter is rare. The female lays about 200 eggs during her ninety-day adult lifespan. If the female mates with a male she produces male and female offspring; if she goes unmated, her eggs will all yield male offspring. The eggs are tan ovoids half a millimeter long. The larva is tan in its first stage and bright scarlet red in its second. Both larva and adult feed upon the alligator weed, generally on leaf buds and along leaf edges, causing curling of the leaves and stunting of the plant.

References 

 Coombs, E. M. et al., Eds. (2004). Biological Control of Invasive Plants in the United States. Corvallis: Oregon State University Press, 143.

External links 
 TAMU Biocontrol Profile
 alligatorweed thrips on the UF / IFAS Featured Creatures Web site

Phlaeothripidae
Insects used for control of invasive plants
Insects described in 1968
Insects of South America